William W. Dieleman (born January 19, 1931) was an American politician in the state of Iowa.

Dieleman was born in Oskaloosa, Iowa. He attended Calvin College and the University of Iowa and was a life insurance underwriter and newspaper publisher. He served in the Iowa State Senate from 1983 to 1995, and House of Representatives from 1975 to 1983 as a Democrat.

References

1931 births
Living people
People from Oskaloosa, Iowa
Businesspeople from Iowa
Democratic Party Iowa state senators
Democratic Party members of the Iowa House of Representatives
Calvin University alumni
University of Iowa alumni
American newspaper publishers (people)